Bernard II (30 April 1224) was Lord of Lippe from 1167 until 1196. He founded the towns of Lippstadt and Lemgo.

Marriage and children 
In 1167, Bernard married Heilwig (1150–1196), likely the daughter of Otto, Count of Are-Hochstaden. They had eleven children who survived into adulthood.

Five sons:
 Herman II (117525 Apr 1229)
 Otto II († 28 Jul 1227); Bishop of Utrecht from 1215
 Bernard IV († 14 Apr 1247); Bishop of Paderborn from 1228
 Dietrich († 28 Jul 1227); killed at the Battle of Ane
 Gerhard II (28 August 1258); Archbishop of Bremen from 1219

Six daughters:
 Gertrud II, Abbess of the Imperial Abbey at Herford from 1217 to 1239
 Kunigunde, Abbess of Freckenhorst from 1219 to 
 Adelheid, married Heinrich I of Arnsberg, as a widow she became the Abbess of Elten
 Heilwig (after 1244), married Gottfried II. of Ziegenhain
 Beatrix († 1244), married Heidenrich I. of Lutterberg

Margarethe of Lippe († 1221) is frequently listed as a daughter of Bernard II and an unknown mother. This remains unproven.

External links 
 

1140s births
Year of birth uncertain
1224 deaths
Lords of Lippe
House of Lippe